Statistics of Qatar Stars League for the 1981–82 season.

Overview
Al-Rayyan Sports Club won the championship.

References
Qatar - List of final tables (RSSSF)

1981–82 in Asian association football leagues
1981–82 in Qatari football